Hyperion was a bimonthly literary magazine published out of Munich by Franz Blei and Carl Sternheim. Between 1908 and 1910, twelve booklets in ten editions appeared.

It was an expensively produced booklet with modern graphics created by Walter Tiemann. Not only major authors published in the magazine, but also unknown and first-published authors. The first eight prose works of Franz Kafka appeared in the magazine: Die Bäume, Kleider, Die Abweisung, Der Kaufmann, Zerstreutes Hinausschaun, Der Nachhauseweg, Die Vorüberlaufenden und Der Fahrgast.

Artists and writers

Artists 
 Aubrey Beardsley
 Erich Heckel
 Aristide Maillol
 Auguste Rodin
 Paul Signac
 Heinrich Kley

Writers
 Franz Blei
 Rudolf Borchardt
 Max Brod
 Hans Carossa
 Paul Claudel
 Carl Einstein
 André Gide
 Hugo von Hofmannsthal
 Franz Kafka
 Heinrich Mann
 George Meredith
 Robert Musil
 Rainer Maria Rilke
 René Schickele
 Carl Sternheim

References

1908 establishments in Germany
1910 disestablishments in Germany
Bi-monthly magazines published in Germany
Defunct literary magazines published in Germany
German-language magazines
Magazines established in 1908
Magazines disestablished in 1910
Magazines published in Munich